The Caproni Ca.71, originally Ca.70L, was a two-seat biplane night fighter produced in Italy in 1927. It was derived from the Caproni Ca.70 of 1925.

Design
Undaunted by the lack of interest the Regia Aeronautica (Italian Royal Air Force) had displayed in the Caproni Ca.70 night fighter after official tests in 1926, the Caproni company designed a derivative. It was initially designated the Ca.70L and then redesignated the Ca.71. Like the Ca.70, the Ca.71 was designed to ensure good low-speed handling and good visibility from both cockpits, without any of the aircrafts structural elements obstructing the view of either crewman. Its two wings were of unequal span, and it had tailskid landing gear, an unusual feature of which was an oleo-pneumatic shock absorber on the main landing gear which allowed the wheels to travel forward in their linkage while the plane was taxiing. Armament consisted of two fixed forward-firing 7.7-millimeter Vickers machine guns and a flexible 7.7-millimeter Lewis machine gun on a Scarff ring in the rear cockpit.

The Ca.71 differed from the Ca.70 in engine installation. The Ca.70s tractor-mounted Bristol Jupiter engine was replaced by a pusher configuration, and the Ca.71 was designed to operate with various engines ranging from 298 to 373 kilowatts (400 to 500 horsepower). The lone Ca.71 built had a 298-kW (400-hp) 12-cylinder Lorraine-Dietrich Vee-type engine and was slightly heavier than the Ca.70, but otherwise was identical to the Ca.70.

Operational history
The Ca.71 first flew in 1927. It was slightly slower and had a slightly lower rate of climb than the Ca.70, although its capacity to accommodate a more powerful engine may have allowed it to overcome this. At any rate, the Regia Aeronautica had no more interest in procuring the Ca.71 than it had in the Ca.70, and no further examples were built.

Operators

Regia Aeronautica

Specifications (Ca.71)

See also
Caproni Ca.70

Notes

References

Green, William, and Gordon Swanborough. The Complete Book of Fighters: An Illustrated Encyclopedia of Every Fighter Aircraft Built and Flown. New York: SMITHMARK Publishers, 1994. .

1920s Italian fighter aircraft
Ca.071
Aircraft first flown in 1927
Sesquiplanes
Biplanes